In Chinese communities, especially in China, Hong Kong, Malaysia, and Singapore, wedding door games are challenges set up by the bridesmaids for the groom as a ceremonial demonstration of the groom's love for the bride.  These games typically take place in the morning of the wedding at the bride's family home, before the groom is allowed to receive the bride in the bride's room. The groom typically receives the help of his groomsmen in completing the tasks.

Common games include the consumption of unpleasant foods, answering of questions pertaining to the bride and the bride and groom's relationship, and performance of song and dance. Negotiations are commonly made regarding the bridesmaids' demands, accompanied almost always by bargaining concerning the red envelope offerings to the bridesmaids. These games originated in ancient Chinese folk customs, and have been elaborated on in modern times.

Naming 

Door games are known in Chinese in mainland China as "games with which to receive the groom"   or "games with which to block the door"  . In Hong Kong, the process is known in Cantonese as "playing with the groom".

In Malaysia, these games are called heng dai games, after the Cantonese word referring to the groomsmen, while in Singapore, the process is known as the wedding gatecrash.

Typical components 

Before the games start, the groom and groomsmen must first pay a fee in order for the bridesmaids to open the door. It is common for the groom and groomsmen to prepare red envelopes filled with cash that they use to negotiate with the bridesmaids who guard the door. These amounts are usually in multiples of auspicious numbers, such as the number 8 that signifies wealth, or 9, that signifies a long-lasting union. Groomsmen often will carry ample amounts of red envelopes and try to negotiate with the bridesmaids as to the amount of red envelopes that is required before they agree to open to the door.

Door games usually include the consumption of unpleasant or strange food or drink. In particular, grooms are made to consume foods that are sour, sweet, bitter and spicy in succession, to signify his resolve to weather the joys and sorrows of marriage with his partner. Bitter foods used for this purpose include bitter tea and bitter gourd, while spicy foods include wasabi and chilli padi. In addition, declarations of love through words, songs and poems from the groom may also be requested. It is not uncommon for door games to also include physical tests, such as push-ups, and cross-dressing, especially in Malaysia and Singapore.

Contemporary opinions

Singapore 

Wedding door games are an opportunity for grooms to demonstrate their resolve and commitment, which some brides appreciate. The practice is also seen by some as a valued tradition and a rite of passage. Wedding games may also add to the fun and excitement of the wedding.

However, the prospect of these challenges may induce anxiety in grooms before the wedding. In addition, many couples are becoming disillusioned about the meaning provided by such games, noting that the games are humiliating and labour-intensive to prepare. Some couples set boundaries on the games, such as excluding sexual elements. One wedding photographer estimated in 2016 that roughly 20% of Singaporean Chinese couples do away with such wedding door games, even while retaining the other elements of a traditional Chinese wedding.

Notes 

Chinese culture
Chinese-Singaporean culture
Chinese-Malaysian culture
Chinese culture in Hong Kong
Marriage in Chinese culture
Wedding traditions